The Hora razorbelly minnow or Hora's razorbelly minnow (Salmostoma horai) is a species of ray-finned fish in the genus Salmostoma.

References 

 

horai
Fish described in 1951